The 1992 Australian Grand Prix was a Formula One motor race held at Adelaide on 8 November 1992. It was the sixteenth and final round of the 1992 FIA Formula One World Championship. The most significant moment was a collision between Ayrton Senna and Nigel Mansell as the Brazilian attempted to overtake the Englishman, eliminating both drivers. This was intended to be Mansell's final Formula One race before moving to IndyCars, although he returned briefly in 1994 and 1995.

Martin Brundle (who spent 1993 with Ligier), race winner Gerhard Berger (who returned to Ferrari) and Riccardo Patrese (who joined Benetton) were among the many drivers for whom this was the final race with their current teams, while for Jan Lammers, Stefano Modena, Maurício Gugelmin and Olivier Grouillard it was the last Grand Prix of their careers.

This was McLaren's final race using a Honda engine until 2015. The company ceased their full factory involvement in the sport following this race, although the Mugen arm of the company continued. This was also the last F1 win for Honda as a full-works engine supplier until the 2006 Hungarian Grand Prix and the last F1 podium for Honda as a full-works engine supplier until the 2001 Spanish Grand Prix.

This Grand Prix also proved to be the last for the March team.

Qualifying

Qualifying report
Williams and McLaren shared the first two rows with Nigel Mansell taking pole, from Ayrton Senna, Riccardo Patrese and Gerhard Berger. Michael Schumacher was fifth in his Benetton, with Jean Alesi sixth for Ferrari.

Qualifying classification

Race

Race report
Nicola Larini started this race from the back of the grid. A first-lap collision between the Tyrrell of Olivier Grouillard and the Dallara of Pierluigi Martini had eliminated both drivers on the same lap. The order of the top six at the end of the first lap was Mansell, Senna, Patrese, Berger, Schumacher and Alesi. Mansell as usual was unable to pull away, whilst Senna in second tried his hardest to pass the Williams on lap 8, but was unable to do so. Gugelmin for the second race running had spun out and crashed by lap 9.

Senna ran wide and allowed Mansell to retain the lead. The order of the top two remained the same until lap 19 when they collided at the Mistral hairpin; Senna attempted to overtake Mansell but crashed into the rear of the Williams (eliminating both drivers). This allowed Riccardo Patrese to take the lead from lap 20 in the remaining Williams, but was under enormous pressure from Gerhard Berger who was a close second. Berger, like Senna, attempted to pass the Williams on the outside but ran wide. Berger pitted for fresh tyres on lap 35, as did Michael Schumacher in the leading Benetton five laps later; the German rejoined four seconds behind Berger.

Martin Brundle was able to pass Jean Alesi in the leading Ferrari for third during their pit-stops. Patrese lead by 20 seconds over Berger by the end of lap 50 until his engine failed on the next lap. Thus allowing Berger to take the lead and hold on to the lead for the remaining 31 laps and took the eighth victory of his career ahead of a hard-charging Schumacher by less than a second. The order of the top six was Berger winning ahead of, Michael Schumacher, Brundle, Alesi, Thierry Boutsen and Stefano Modena in the Jordan.

Jordan scored their only point of the season with Stefano Modena, while Thierry Boutsen (who won here in 1989) scored his only 1992 season points, and the last points of his career. Benetton's double podium finish ensured that they scored points in every round, as Benetton were the first team to score points in every round of a season since Lotus in 1963.

Race classification

Championship standings after the race
Bold text indicates the World Champions.

Drivers' Championship standings

Constructors' Championship standings

 Note: Only the top five positions are included for both sets of standings.

References

Grand Prix
Australian Grand Prix
Australian Grand Prix
Motorsport in Adelaide
Australian Grand Prix